"Mombasa" is a song by the Finnish singer Taiska (Hannele Aulikki Kauppinen). The song, named after the city in Kenya, was released in 1975 and it is Taiska’s most popular song.

History

"Mombasa" was made in 1975. For this song, Taiska used the melody of a musical composition by Fabio Frizzi. This composition, named Ibo lele, was used in the Italian erotic film Amore libero - Free Love, directed by Pier Ludovico Pavoni. Jyrki Lindström wrote the lyrics for "Mombasa".

In popular culture
Hannu Tuomainen used this song as an inspiration for his film One-Way Ticket to Mombasa.
"Mombasa" is mentioned in the book Crime Novel: Nordic noir like nothing you've read before by Petri Tamminen.

References

External links
Taiska Mombasa

Finnish pop songs
1975 songs